Koth  is a village in the Ballia District of Uttar Pradesh, India. As of 2011 census, this village had a population of 9,345.

References

Villages in Ballia district